Omni was an American tech-based on-demand storage and rental company based in San Francisco, California. Founded in 2014 by Aaron Wiener, Adam Dexter, and current CEO Tom McLeod, Omni debuted its service in Fall 2015. Initially, the company focused on storage and space-management: customers would have their items picked up by Omni, which would categorize and photograph them. When the client wanted their item back, they would request to have it dropped off by Omni, possibly at an additional fee. Omni has since expanded into offering other services such as the option to lend items to friends and the ability to rent out items for profit. As of July 2018, Omni is only available in the San Francisco Bay area, but has announced plans to expand into Portland, Oregon. Omni has raised around $39 million in investment, with nearly $15 million coming from traditional sources such as venture capital firms and approximately $25 million coming in the form of Ripple.

Omni ceased operation at the end of 2019.

Services

Omni's base service is on-demand storage, which began in Fall 2015 for residents and businesses of the San Francisco area. Clients can request that an Omni concierge come to pick up any items that they wish to store. Omni concierges take these items and bring them to a warehouse, where they are categorized and photographed. A user's stored items are available in a digital inventory accessible through the Omni app. When customers request that any stored items be returned to them, the items will be retrieved from the warehouse and brought back by an Omni concierge. All items up to $2,000 in value are guaranteed by the company, which will either reimburse of replace them if lost or damaged.

Fees for Omni's storage services can vary depending on what is being stored and how quickly the item must be delivered or picked up. "Standard-sized" items, such as a jackets or toasters, cost $0.50 per month to store, while larger items, such as bicycles or backpacks, cost $3. Closed containers, which are not individually itemized, cost $7.50 per month. Deliveries of items to clients is at no cost if two days' notice are given, while pickups may be free even if scheduled on the same day. Omni can deliver and pick up items at a minimum of two hours' notice, though a premium is added for this expedited service.

On top of their storage services, Omni also allows users to lend items to others, with similar delivery costs and shipping outside of the San Francisco Bay area carrying a 20% surcharge on top of shipping through a non-Omni service.

In Fall 2017, Omni began its rental service, permitting users to rent out any items they store with Omni. Omni splits the proceeds equally with the user.

In May 2018, Omni announced that it would be expanding into the Portland area.

Reception
Views on Omni's business have been mixed. Some consumers have viewed Omni as a viable solution to a lack of space and as a way to make some extra money through its rental service. Cyan Bannister, a San Francisco venture capitalist, invested in the company because she believes that "all sorts of businesses will flock to Omni for rentals." The proprietor of a business using Omni, Nicolas Grenie of SF Cheese Party, said that it was easy for him to start his business because Omni handled many of the logistics, but also that the price point seemed unreasonable for Omni to make a profit. The President of Boxbee, a company which had offered a storage and sharing service similar to Omni's, had similar concerns, saying "The cost of storing, transporting and managing a customer’s items is much higher than the cost you can charge on a monthly basis to store it." Similarly, April Rinne, who consults for other on-demand companies, said that Omni was "making some really big bets on volume." Ryan Delk, Chief Operations Officer of Omni, has commented on these concerns, stating that "We invested 2.5 years in building out the supply side of the marketplace and honing the details of a same-day last-mile logistics business."

References

External links
Omni website

Companies based in San Francisco
Technology companies based in the San Francisco Bay Area
2014 establishments in California
American companies established in 2014
Technology companies established in 2014